Erich Maria Remarque (born Erich Paul Remark; 22 June 1898 – 25 September 1970) was a German-born novelist. His landmark novel All Quiet on the Western Front (1928), based on his experience in the Imperial German Army during World War I, was an international bestseller which created a new literary genre, and was adapted to film several times. Remarque's anti-war themes led to his condemnation by Nazi propaganda minister Joseph Goebbels as "unpatriotic". He was able to use his literary success to relocate to Switzerland and the United States, where he became a naturalized citizen.

Early life
Remarque was born on 22 June 1898, as Erich Paul Remark, to Peter Franz Remark and Anna Maria, a working-class Roman Catholic family in Osnabrück. He was never close with his father, a bookbinder, but he was close with his mother and he began using the middle name Maria after World War I in her honor. Remarque was the third of four children of Peter and Anna. His siblings were his older sister Erna, older brother Theodor Arthur (who died at the age of five or six), and younger sister Elfriede.

The spelling of his last name was changed to Remarque when he published All Quiet on the Western Front in honor of his French ancestors and in order to dissociate himself from his earlier novel The Dream Room. His grandfather had changed the spelling from Remarque to Remark in the 19th century. Research by Remarque's childhood and lifelong friend Hanns-Gerd Rabe proved that Remarque had French ancestors his great-grandfather Johann Adam Remarque, who was born in 1789, came from a French family in Aachen. This is contrary to the falsehood perpetuated by Nazi propaganda that his real last name was Kramer ("Remark" spelled backwards) and that he was Jewish.

Military service
During World War I, Remarque was conscripted into the Imperial German Army at the age of 18. On 12 June 1917, he was transferred to the Western Front, 2nd Company, Reserves, Field Depot of the 2nd Guards Reserve Division at Hem-Lenglet. On 26 June 1917 he was posted to the 15th Reserve Infantry Regiment, 2nd Company, Engineer Platoon Bethe, and fought in the trenches between Torhout and Houthulst. On 31 July 1917 he was wounded by shell shrapnel in his left leg, right arm and neck, and after being medically evacuated from the field was repatriated to an army hospital in Germany, where he recovered from his wounds. On October 1918, he was recalled to military service, but the war's armistice a month later put an end to his military career.

Post-war employment
After the war he continued his teacher training and worked from 1 August 1919 as a primary-school teacher in Lohne, at that time in the county of Lingen, now in the county of Bentheim. From May 1920 he worked in Klein Berssen in the former County of Hümmling, now Emsland, and from August 1920 in Nahne, which has been a part of Osnabrück since 1972. On 20 November 1920 he applied for leave of absence from teaching. 

He worked at a number of different jobs in this phase of his life, including librarian, businessman, journalist, and editor. His first paid writing job was as a technical writer for the Continental Rubber Company, a German tire manufacturer.

Writing career
Remarque had made his first attempts at writing at the age of 16. Among them were essays, poems, and the beginnings of a novel that was finished later and published in 1920 as The Dream Room. Between 1923 and 1926 he also scripted a comic series, drawn by Hermann Schütz, published in the magazine Echo Continental, a publication by the rubber and tire company Continental AG.

After coming back from the war, the atrocities of war along with his mother’s death caused him a great deal of mental trauma and grief. In later years as a professional writer, he started using "Maria" as his middle name instead of "Paul", to commemorate his mother. When he published All Quiet on the Western Front, he had his surname reverted to an earlier spelling from Remark to Remarque to dissociate himself from his novel .

In 1927, he published the novel Station at the Horizon. It was serialised in the sports journal  for which Remarque was working. (It was first published in book form in 1998.) All Quiet on the Western Front (1929), his career-defining work, was also written in 1927. Remarque was at first unable to find a publisher for it. Its text described the experiences of German soldiers during World War I. On publication it became an international bestseller and a landmark work in twentieth-century literature. It inspired a new genre of veterans writing about conflict, and the commercial publication of a wide variety of war memoirs. It also inspired dramatic representations of the war in theatre and cinema, in Germany as well as in countries that had fought in the conflict against the German Empire, particularly the United Kingdom and the United States.

Riding on the tail of the success of All Quiet on the Western Front, a number of similar works followed from Remarque. In simple, emotive language, they described wartime and the postwar years in Germany. In 1931, after finishing The Road Back, he bought a villa in Ronco, Switzerland with the substantial financial wealth that his published works had brought him. He planned to live both there and in France.

On 10 May 1933, at the initiative of the Nazi propaganda minister Joseph Goebbels, Remarque's writing was publicly declared as "unpatriotic" and was banned in Germany. Copies were removed from all libraries and restricted from being sold or published anywhere in the country.

Germany was rapidly descending into a totalitarian society, leading to mass arrests of elements of the population of which the new governing order disapproved. Remarque left Germany to live at his villa in Switzerland. His French background as well as his Catholic faith were also publicly attacked by the Nazis. They continued to decry his writings in his absence, proclaiming that anyone who would change the spelling of his name from the German "Remark" to the French "Remarque" could not be a true German. The Nazis further made the false claim that Remarque had not seen active service during World War I. In 1938, Remarque's German citizenship was revoked. In 1939, he and his ex-wife were remarried to prevent her repatriation to Germany. Just before the outbreak of World War II in Europe, they left Porto Ronco, Switzerland for the United States. They became naturalised citizens of the United States in 1947.

Remarque continued to write about the German experience after WWI. His next novel, Three Comrades, spans the years of the Weimar Republic, from the hyperinflation of 1923 to the end of the decade. His fourth novel, Flotsam (in German titled , or Love Thy Neighbour), first appeared in a serial version in English translation in Collier's magazine in 1939. He spent another year revising the text for its book publication in 1941, both in English and German. Another instant bestseller, it reached worldwide sales of nearly five million. His final novel was Shadows in Paradise. He wrote it while living at 320 East 57th Street in New York City. The apartment building "played a prominent role in his novel".

In 1943, the Nazis arrested his youngest sister, Elfriede Scholz, who had stayed behind in Germany with her husband and two children. After a trial at the notorious  (Hitler's extra-constitutional "People's Court"), she was found guilty of "undermining morale" for stating that she considered the war lost. Court President Roland Freisler declared, "" ("Your brother is unfortunately beyond our reach you, however, will not escape us.") Scholz was beheaded on 16 December 1943. Remarque later said that his sister had been involved in anti-Nazi resistance activities.

In exile, Remarque was unaware of his sister Elfriede's fate until after the war. He would dedicate his 1952 novel Spark of Life to her. The dedication was omitted in the German version of the book, reportedly because he was still seen as a traitor by some Germans.

Later years

In 1948, Remarque returned to Switzerland, where he spent the remainder of his life. There was a gap of seven years a long silence for Remarque between Arch of Triumph and his next work, Spark of Life, which appeared both in German and in English in 1952. While he was writing The Spark of Life he was also working on a novel  (Time to Live and Time to Die). It was published first in English translation in 1954 with the not-quite-literal title A Time to Love and a Time to Die. In 1958, Douglas Sirk directed the film A Time to Love and a Time to Die in Germany, based on Remarque's novel. Remarque made a cameo appearance in the film in the role of the Professor.

In 1955, Remarque wrote the screenplay for an Austrian film The Last Act, about Hitler's final days in the bunker of the Reich Chancellery in Berlin, which was based on the book Ten Days to Die (1950) by Michael Musmanno. In 1956, Remarque wrote a drama Full Circle for the stage, which played in both Germany and on Broadway. An English translation was published in 1974. Heaven Has No Favorites was serialised (as Borrowed Life) in 1959 before appearing as a book in 1961 and was made into the 1977 film Bobby Deerfield. The Night in Lisbon, published in 1962, is the last work Remarque finished. The novel sold about 900,000 copies in Germany.

Personal life

Remarque's first marriage was to the actress Ilse Jutta Zambona in 1925. The marriage was stormy and unfaithful on both sides. Remarque and Zambona divorced in 1930, but in 1933 they fled together to Switzerland. In 1938, they remarried, to prevent her from being forced to return to Germany, and in 1939 they emigrated to the United States, where they both became naturalized citizens in 1947. They divorced again on 20 May 1957, this time for good. Ilse Remarque died on 25 June 1975.

During the 1930s, Remarque had relationships with Austrian actress Hedy Lamarr, Mexican actress Dolores del Río, and German actress Marlene Dietrich. The affair with Dietrich began in September 1937, when they met on the Lido while in Venice for the film festival, and continued until at least 1940, maintained mostly by way of letters, telegrams and telephone calls. A selection of their letters was published in 2003 in the book  ("Tell Me That You Love Me") and then in the 2011 play Puma.

Remarque married actress Paulette Goddard in 1958.

Death
Remarque died of heart failure at the age of 72 in Locarno on 25 September 1970. His body was buried in the Ronco Cemetery in Ronco, Ticino, Switzerland. 

Goddard, Remarque's wife, died in 1990, and her body was interred next to her husband's. She left a bequest of US$20 million to New York University to fund an institute for European studies, which is named in honour of Remarque, as well as funding "Goddard Hall" on the Greenwich Village campus in New York City.

Legacy

The first director of The Remarque Institute was Professor Tony Judt. Remarque's papers are housed at NYU's Fales Library.

In November 2010, efforts to raise 6.2 million Swiss francs (US$7M), to buy and save the villa of Erich Maria Remarque and Paulette Goddard from demolition were underway. The intent was to transform the "Casa Monte Tabor" into a museum and home to an artist-in-residence program. In 2017, the property was being offered for sale as a private residence.

List of works
Note: the dates of English publications are those of the first publications in book form.

Novels

 (1920) ; English translation: The Dream Room
 (written 1924, published 1998) 
 (1928) ; English translation: Station at the Horizon
 (1929) ; English translation: All Quiet on the Western Front (1929)
 (1931) ; English translation: The Road Back (1931)
 (1936) ; English translation: Three Comrades (1937)
 (1939) ; English translation: Flotsam (1941)
 (1945) ; English translation: Arch of Triumph (1945) (Reviewed by Dr. Albert Simard in Free World)
 (1952) ; English translation: Spark of Life (1952)
 (1954) ; English translation: A Time to Love and a Time to Die (1954)
 (1956) ; English translation: The Black Obelisk (1957)
 (1961)  (serialized as ); English translation: Heaven Has No Favorites (1961)
 (1962) ; English translation: The Night in Lisbon (1964)
 (1970) ; English translation: The Promised Land
 (1971) ; English translation: Shadows in Paradise (1972)

Other works
 (1931) ; English translation: The Enemy (1930–1931); short stories
 (1955) ; English translation: The Last Act; screenplay
 (1956) ; English translation: Full Circle (1974); play
 (1988) ; English translation: The Return of Enoch J. Jones; play
 (1994) ; English translation: A Militant Pacifist; interviews and essays

See also

 Exilliteratur

References

Further reading

External links

 
 Multilingual pages about Erich Maria Remarque
 
 German Language Guide to the Remarque papers at NYU's Fales Library
 
 

1898 births
1970 deaths
20th-century American dramatists and playwrights
20th-century American male writers
20th-century American novelists
20th-century American screenwriters
20th-century German male writers
20th-century German novelists
20th-century German short story writers
American male dramatists and playwrights
American male novelists
American male screenwriters
American people of French descent
American writers in German
Commanders Crosses of the Order of Merit of the Federal Republic of Germany
Emigrants from Nazi Germany to Switzerland
Emigrants from Nazi Germany to the United States
Exilliteratur writers
German comics writers
German male novelists
German male short story writers
German Army personnel of World War I
German people of French descent
German Roman Catholics
Lost Generation writers
Military personnel from Osnabrück
People from Bentheim
People from the Province of Hanover
People who lost German citizenship
People with acquired American citizenship
Prussian Army personnel
Roman Catholic writers
War writers
Writers from Osnabrück